Chợ Mới is a township and capital of Chợ Mới District, An Giang Province, Vietnam.

It is known as "the Mecca" of the Hòa Hảo sect.

References

Communes of An Giang province
Populated places in An Giang province
District capitals in Vietnam
Townships in Vietnam